The 2010 Horizon League men's basketball tournament was played Tuesday, March 2 through Tuesday, March 9. The Horizon League Network broadcast the opening rounds, which were played at the home courts of the higher seeds. The Quarterfinals, Semifinals and Championship games were broadcast by ESPNU and ESPN/ESPN360.com respectively, and took place at the arena of the #1 overall seed, Butler University. The winner received an automatic bid to the 2010 NCAA tournament.

Seeds 

All Horizon League schools played in the tournament. Teams were seeded by 2009–10 Horizon League Conference season record, with a tiebreaker system to seed teams with identical conference records. The top 2 teams, Butler and Wright State, received a bye to the Semifinals.

Schedule

Bracket 

First round games at campus sites of lower-numbered seeds
Second round, semifinals, and championship were hosted by the #1 Overall Seed, Butler.
All times ET.

Honors 

Matt Howard of Butler was named the tournament MVP.

Horizon League All-Tournament Team

References 

Tournament
Horizon League men's basketball tournament
Horizon
Horizon League men's basketball tournament
Horizon League men's basketball tournament
College basketball tournaments in Indiana